Bathybembix delicatula is a species of deep-water sea snail, a marine gastropod mollusk in the family Eucyclidae.

Description
The shell grows to a height of 23 mm.

Distribution
This species occurs in Antarctic waters.

References

 Engl W. (2012) Shells of Antarctica. Hackenheim: Conchbooks. 402 pp

delicatula
Gastropods described in 1990